Bhagabat Prasad Mohanty (27 November 1929 – 8 December 2019) was an Indian politician and lawyer from Odisha belonging to Indian National Congress. He was elected as a legislator of the Odisha Legislative Assembly three times. He also served as Higher Education Minister of the Government of Odisha.

Biography
Mohanty was born on 27 November 1929. He was elected as a legislator of the Odisha Legislative Assembly from Kendrapara in 1971 as a Praja Socialist Party candidate. Later, he joined Indian National Congress. He was elected as a legislator of the Odisha Legislative Assembly as an Indian National Congress candidate in 1985 and 1995.

Mohanty died on 8 December 2019 at the age of 90.

References

1929 births
2019 deaths
Members of the Odisha Legislative Assembly
Indian National Congress politicians from Odisha
Praja Socialist Party politicians
People from Kendrapara district
State cabinet ministers of Odisha